Odivelas station is the northern terminus on the Yellow Line of the Lisbon Metro in the Odivelas neighbourhood, north west of central Lisbon.

History
The station opened on 27 March 2004 in conjunction with the Senhor Roubado, Ameixoeira, Lumiar and Quinta das Conchas stations, and it is located on Rua Professor Doutor Egas Moniz.

The architectural design of the station is by Paulo Brito da Silva.

Connections

Suburban Buses

Rodoviária de Lisboa 
 001 Odivelas (Metro) - circulação via Casal do Chapim
 003 Odivelas (Metro) - circulação via Arroja
 206 Pontinha (Metro) ⇄ Senhor Roubado (Metro) via Serra da Luz
 207 Odivelas (Metro) - circulação via Sete Castelos
 208 Arroja - circulação via Odivelas (Metro)
 209 Arroja - circulação via Patameiras (Centro Comercial)
 211 Odivelas (Metro) ⇄ Ramada (Bairro dos Bons Dias)
 214 Odivelas (Metro) ⇄ Casal da Paradela
 225 Odivelas (Metro) ⇄ Loures (Hospital Beatriz Angelo)
 228 Pontinha (Metro) ⇄ Jardim da Amoreira
 229 Odivelas (Metro) - circulação via Colinas do Cruzeiro
 230 Odivelas (Metro) ⇄ Casal de Cambra (Centro de Saúde)
 235 Odivelas (Metro) ⇄ Casal da Paradela
 237 Odivelas (Odivelas Parque) - circulação via Odivelas (Metro)
 238 Odivelas (Metro) ⇄ Loures (IKEA)
 240 Olival Basto - circulação via Póvoa de Santo Adrião
 335 Lisboa (Campo Grande) ⇄ Bucelas via Fanhões
 337 Lisboa (Campo Grande) ⇄ Tojal
 365 Odivelas ⇄ Loures (Centro Comercial)
 901 Lisboa (Campo Grande) ⇄ Caneças (Escola Secundária)
 905 Pontinha (Metro) ⇄ Odivelas (Metro) via Serra da Luz
 913 Odivelas (Metro) ⇄ Caneças (Escola Secundária) via Patameiras
 916 Odivelas (Metro) - circulalção via Casal Novo
 925 Odivelas (Metro) ⇄ Loures (Hospital Beatriz Angelo) via Jardim da Amoreira
 926 Odivelas (Metro) ⇄ Arroja
 931 Lisboa (Campo Grande) ⇄ Pontinha (Metro) via Centro Comercial
 934 Odivelas (Metro) ⇄ Montemor

See also
 List of Lisbon metro stations

References

External links

Yellow Line (Lisbon Metro) stations
Railway stations opened in 2004